American entertainer Justin Timberlake has released four video albums and has been featured in thirty-seven music videos, seventeen films, fifteen television shows, and six commercials. He achieved early fame when he appeared in the Disney Channel television series The All-New Mickey Mouse Club, alongside singers Britney Spears and Christina Aguilera and actor Ryan Gosling. Timberlake rose to fame in the late 1990s as the lead singer of the boy band NSYNC. In 2002, he launched his solo career and released his solo debut single "Like I Love You", the music video for which was directed by Bucky Chrome. Francis Lawrence directed the video for "Cry Me a River". The video features Timberlake's character as he spies on a former lover, who according to the director portrays his former romantic interest Spears. At the 2003 MTV Video Music Awards, the video won the accolades for Best Male Video and Best Pop Video.

In 2005, Timberlake starred in the thriller Edison alongside Morgan Freeman and Kevin Spacey. The film received negative reviews from film critics and was a box office bomb. He then portrayed Frankie Ballenbacher in the crime drama Alpha Dog (2006); it received mixed responses from critics and attained box office success. The same year, Timberlake released his second studio album FutureSex/LoveSounds—four music videos for singles from the album were shot. Samuel Bayer directed the music video for "What Goes Around... Comes Around" (2007) in which American actress Scarlett Johansson plays Timberlake's love interest. From 2007 until 2009, he appeared in the music videos for his collaborations with other artists including 50 Cent ("Ayo Technology"), Madonna ("4 Minutes") and T.I. ("Dead and Gone").

Timberlake starred in the 2010 drama The Social Network, in which he portrayed Sean Parker, the first president of Facebook. The film received acclaim from critics and was a box office success. In 2011, he starred in the comedies Bad Teacher and Friends with Benefits alongside Cameron Diaz and Mila Kunis respectively. Both films were financial successes. The music videos for his songs "Mirrors" and "Suit & Tie" were released in 2013. They earned him a MTV Video Music Award for Video of the Year and a Grammy Award for Best Music Video, respectively. Timberlake has also hosted Saturday Night Live five times, being both host and musical guest three times. In film, he released Justin Timberlake + The Tennessee Kids and voiced Branch in Trolls (2016) as well as its sequel Trolls World Tour (2020).

Music videos

As a performer

Guest appearances

Video albums

Filmography

Film

Television

Commercials

Notes

References

External links 
Justin Timberlake's official Vevo channel on YouTube
Justin Timberlake at AllMovie
Justin Timberlake at Rotten Tomatoes

Justin Timberlake
Timberlake, Justin
Timberlake, Justin
Timberlake, Justin